Flapping or tapping, also known as alveolar flapping, intervocalic flapping, or t-voicing, is a phonological process found in many varieties of English, especially North American, Cardiff, Ulster, Australian and New Zealand English, whereby the voiceless alveolar stop consonant phoneme  is pronounced as a voiced alveolar flap , a sound produced by briefly tapping the alveolar ridge with the tongue, when placed between vowels. In London English, the flapped  is perceived as a casual pronunciation intermediate between the "posh" affricate  and the "rough" glottal stop . In similar positions, the combination  may be pronounced as a nasalized flap , making winter sound similar or identical to winner.

Terminology and articulation
The terms flap and tap are often used synonymously, although some authors make a distinction between them. When the distinction is made, a flap involves a rapid backward and forward movement of the tongue tip, while a tap involves an upward and downward movement. Linguists disagree on whether the sound produced in the present process is a flap or a tap, and by extension on whether the process is better called flapping or tapping, while flapping has traditionally been more widely used.  identify four types of sounds produced in the process: alveolar tap, down-flap, up-flap, and postalveolar tap (found in autumn, Berta, otter, and murder, respectively).

In Cockney, another voiced variant of  that has been reported to occur to coexist with the alveolar tap (and other allophones, such as the very common glottal stop) is a simple voiced alveolar stop , which occurs especially in the words little , hospital  and whatever .

It also involves a larger part of the tongue.

Distribution

Some linguists consider it obligatory for most American dialects to flap  between a stressed and an unstressed vowel. Flapping of  also occurs in Australian, New Zealand and (especially Northern) Irish English, and more infrequently or variably in South African English, Cockney, and Received Pronunciation.

Across word boundaries, however, it can occur between any two vowels, provided the second vowel begins a word (as in get over ). This extends to morphological boundaries within compound words (as in whatever ). In addition to vowels, segments that may precede the flap include  (as in party) and occasionally  (as in faulty). Flapping after  is more common in Canadian English than in American English. Syllabic  may also follow the flap (as in bottle).

The second syllables in the former set of words can thus be considered as having secondary stress.

Word-medial flapping is also prohibited in foot-initial positions. This prevents words such as militaristic, spirantization, and Mediterranean from flapping, despite capitalistic and alphabetization, for example, being flapped. This is known as the Withgott effect.

In North American English, the cluster  (but not ) in the same environment as flapped  may be realized as a nasal flap . Intervocalic  is also often realized as a nasal flap, so words like winter and winner can become homophonous.

Given these intricacies, it is difficult to formulate a phonological rule that accurately predicts flapping. Nevertheless,  postulates that it applies to alveolar stops:
before an unstressed vowel within words, or before any vowel across a word boundary;
when not in foot-initial position.

Exceptions include the preposition/particle to and words derived from it, such as today, tonight, tomorrow, and together, wherein  may be flapped when intervocalic (as in go to sleep ). In Australian English, numerals thirteen, fourteen, and eighteen are often flapped despite the second vowel being stressed.

Homophony
Flapping is a specific type of lenition, specifically intervocalic weakening. Some speakers, however, flap only  but not . Yet, for a minority of speakers, the merger can occur only if neither sound is flapped. For speakers with the merger, the following utterances sound the same or almost the same:

In accents characterized by Canadian raising, such words as riding and writing may be flapped yet still distinguished by the quality of the vowel: riding , writing . Vowel duration may also be different, with a longer vowel before  than before , due to pre-fortis clipping.

Withgott effect

In a dissertation in 1982, M.M. Withgott demonstrated that, among speakers of American English, words seem to be chunked into pronunciation units she referred to as a foot, similar to a metrical unit in poetry. Such chunking was said to block flapping in the word ‘Mediterranean’ ([[Medi[terranean] ], cf. [ [sub[terranean]]). How a word is chunked relates to its morphological derivation, as seen by contrasting morphologically similar pairs such as the following (where the vertical bar shows where Withgott argued there is boundary between neighboring feet):

The medial t in càpitalístic can be flapped as easily as in post-stress cátty [ˈkʰæɾi], in contrast to the medial t in mìlitarístic, which comes at the beginning of a foot, and so must be pronounced as [tʰ], like a t at the beginning of a word.

Long, seemingly monomorphemic words also are chunked in English for purposes of pronunciation. In such words [t]’s — as well as the other unvoiced stops — are pronounced like initial segments whenever they receive secondary stress or are at the beginning of a foot:

Navra tilóva

Abra cadábra

Ala kazám

Rázz matàzz

But:

Fliberti  gibety

Humu humu nuku nuku apu a‘a

T-to-R rule
It is applied in Northern England English and it is always stigmatized. The application of that rule means that shut in the phrasal verb to shut up  has a different phonemic form than the citation form of the verb to shut . The rule is typically not applied in the word-internal position.

The T-to-R rule has also been reported to occur in the Cardiff dialect (where the merged consonant can surface as either an approximant or a flap) and South African English (where only a flap is possible). There, the merger occurs word-internally between vowels in those environments where flapping is possible in North American English.

See also
Phonological history of English consonants
Regional accents of English

Notes

References

Bibliography

Further reading
Withgott, M. Margaret. 1982. Segmental Evidence for Phonological Constituents. Ph.D. Dissertation for the University of Texas at Austin.
Iverson, Gregory K. and Sang-Cheol Ahn. 2004. English Voicing in Dimensional Theory. Language Sciences (Phonology of English).
Kahn, Daniel. 1976. Syllable-Based Generalizations in English Phonology. Ph.D. Dissertation for the University of Massachusetts reproduced by I.U. Linguistics Club.
Steriade, Donca. 1999. Paradigm uniformity and the phonetics-phonology boundary. In M. Broe and J. Pierrehumbert (eds.), Papers in Laboratory Phonology V: Acquisition and the lexicon, 313-334. Cambridge: Cambridge University Press.

English phonology
North American English
Australian English
New Zealand English
Splits and mergers in English phonology